The proton affinity (PA, Epa) of an anion or of a neutral atom or molecule is the negative of the enthalpy change in the reaction between the chemical species concerned and a proton in the gas phase:

 A- +  H+ -> HA   
  B + H+ -> BH+ 

These reactions are always exothermic in the gas phase, i.e. energy is released (enthalpy is negative) when the reaction advances in the direction shown above, while the proton affinity is positive. This is the same sign convention used for electron affinity. The property related to the proton affinity is the gas-phase basicity, which is the negative of the Gibbs energy for above reactions, i.e. the gas-phase basicity includes entropic terms in contrast to the proton affinity.

Acid/base chemistry
The higher the proton affinity, the stronger the base and the weaker the conjugate acid in the gas phase. The (reportedly) strongest known base is the ortho-diethynylbenzene dianion (Epa = 1843 kJ/mol), followed by the methanide anion (Epa = 1743 kJ/mol) and the hydride ion (Epa = 1675 kJ/mol), making methane the weakest proton acid in the gas phase, followed by dihydrogen. The weakest known base is the helium atom (Epa = 177.8 kJ/mol), making the hydrohelium(1+) ion the strongest known proton acid.

Hydration
Proton affinities illustrate the role of hydration in aqueous-phase Brønsted acidity. Hydrofluoric acid is a weak acid in aqueous solution (pKa = 3.15) but a very weak acid in the gas phase (Epa (F−) = 1554 kJ/mol): the fluoride ion is as strong a base as SiH3− in the gas phase, but its basicity is reduced in aqueous solution because it is strongly hydrated, and therefore stabilized. The contrast is even more marked for the hydroxide ion (Epa = 1635 kJ/mol), one of the strongest known proton acceptors in the gas phase. Suspensions of potassium hydroxide in dimethyl sulfoxide (which does not solvate the hydroxide ion as strongly as water) are markedly more basic than aqueous solutions, and are capable of deprotonating such weak acids as triphenylmethane (pKa = ca. 30).

To a first approximation, the proton affinity of a base in the gas phase can be seen as offsetting (usually only partially) the extremely favorable hydration energy of the gaseous proton (ΔE = −1530 kJ/mol), as can be seen in the following estimates of aqueous acidity:

These estimates suffer from the fact the free energy change of dissociation is in effect the small difference of two large numbers. However, hydrofluoric acid is correctly predicted to be a weak acid in aqueous solution and the estimated value for the pKa of dihydrogen is in agreement with the behaviour of saline hydrides (e.g., sodium hydride) when used in organic synthesis.

Difference from pKa
Both proton affinity and pKa are measures of the acidity of a molecule, and so both reflect the thermodynamic gradient between a molecule and the anionic form of that molecule upon removal of a proton from it.   Implicit in the definition of pKa however is that the acceptor of this proton is water, and an equilibrium is being established between the molecule and bulk solution.  More broadly, pKa can be defined with reference to any solvent, and many weak organic acids have measured pKa values in DMSO.  Large discrepancies between pKa values in water versus DMSO (i.e., the pKa of water in water is 14, but water in DMSO is 32) demonstrate that the solvent is an active partner in the proton equilibrium process, and so pKa does not represent an intrinsic property of the molecule in isolation.  In contrast, proton affinity is an intrinsic property of the molecule, without explicit reference to the solvent.

A second difference arises in noting that pKa reflects a thermal free energy for the proton transfer process, in which both enthalpic and entropic terms are considered together.  Therefore, pKa is influenced both by the stability of the molecular anion, as well as the entropy associated of forming and mixing new species.  Proton affinity, on the other hand, is not a measure of free energy.

List of compound affinities 
Proton affinities are quoted in kJ/mol, in increasing order of gas-phase basicity of the base.

References 

Chemical properties